Alejandro Ramírez Calderón (born August 15, 1981) is a Colombian former road racing cyclist.

Major results

2002
 1st Overall Vuelta a Colombia Sub-23
1st Stage 6
2003
 2nd Overall Vuelta a Colombia Sub-23
2005
 1st Stage 6 Clásico RCN
2006
 1st Overall Doble Sucre Potosí GP Cemento Fancesa
1st Stage 1
 1st Stage 3 Clasica International de Tulcan
2008
 1st in Stage 1 Vuelta de Higuito
2012
 2nd Overall Vuelta a Colombia
2013
 7th Overall Vuelta a Colombia

External links
 

1981 births
Living people
Colombian male cyclists
Sportspeople from Antioquia Department